Canine coronavirus HuPn-2018, or CCoV-HuPn-2018, is a virus first discovered in a surveillance study in Sarawak, Malaysia, in hospitalized human pneumonia patients. It may be the eighth coronavirus known to cause disease in humans, but no human-to-human transmission has been seen. This is a canine-feline recombinant alphacoronavirus (genotype II) related to the CCoV-II strain of Alphacoronavirus 1 with part of the FCoV in S2 domain and a specific 12 amino acids deletion in the N protein.

References

Animal virology
Alphacoronaviruses
Zoonoses